Voeltzkowia is a genus of skinks.

Geographic range
The genus Voeltzkowia is endemic to Madagascar.

Species
Three species are recognized as being valid.
Voeltzkowia mira 
Voeltzkowia mobydick 
Voeltzkowia yamagishii 

Nota bene: A binomial authority in parentheses indicates that the species was originally described in a genus other than Voeltzkowia.

The species V. mobydick and V. yamagishii were formerly in the genus Sirenoscincus.

The species formerly known as Voeltzkowia fierinensis, V. lineata, V. petiti, and
V. rubrocaudata have been assigned to the genus Grandidierina.

Etymology
The generic name, Voeltzkowia, is in honor of German biologist Alfred Voeltzkow.

References

Further reading
Boettger O (1893). Katalog der Reptilien-Sammlung im Museum der Senckenbergischen Naturforschenden Gesellschaft in Frankfurt am Main. I. Teil (Rhynchocephalen, Schildkröten, Krokodile, Eidechsen, Chamäleons). Frankfurt am Main: Gebrüder Knauer. x + 140 pp. (Voeltzkowia, new genus, p. 116; V. mira, new species, pp. 116–117). (in German).

 
Lizard genera
Taxa named by Oskar Boettger
Endemic fauna of Madagascar